Brittlestar is the stage name of Stewart Reynolds, a Stratford, Ontario based comedian, writer, communications consultant, and online television show host.

His campaign for KFC Canada was the world's most watched branded video on Facebook in the summer of 2017.

Family life 
Reynolds was born to Scottish parents and is based in Stratford, Ontario.

Career 
As a comedian, Reynolds brands himself as "the internet’s favourite dad. Recurring themes in his work are parodies of Canadian politicians, 1980s nostalgia, and support for public health messages about the COVID-19 pandemic. He uses his influence to support charitable causes including the Christmas Wish Tree program and Women’s Crisis Services of Waterloo Region.

Reynolds co-hosts a daily online morning show called The Morning Show Thing with his wife Shannon.

In the Summer of 2017, Reynolds' media campaign for KFC Canada was the global most popular branded video on Facebook.

In April 2022, Reynolds collaborated on comedy videos with Gurdeep Pandher and in December 2022 he released a Christmas music video with actor Emma Rudy Put On Another Christmas Song.

Selected publications 

 Nineteen Fifty Now, 2018, short story
 Shortcuts, 2017, ISBN 978-1522001317

References

External links 

 Official website

Comedians from Ontario
Communications consultants
People from Stratford, Ontario
Canadian television talk show hosts